Athletics at the 2004 Summer Paralympics included 17 events for men and 15 events for women, in 5 disciplines. Athletes competed in one of four disability categories:

 Blind or visually impaired athletes – Sport classes 11 to 13.
 Athletes with cerebral palsy – Sport classes 32 to 34 (wheelchair) and 35 to 38 (standing)
 Amputee and les autres athletes – Sport classes 40 (dwarfism) and 42 to F46 (standing amputees).
 Wheelchair athletes – Sport classes 51 to 54 (track events) and 51 to 58 (field events).

Participating countries

Medal summary

Medal table

Events

Men's events

Women's events

References

See also
 Athletics at the 2004 Summer Olympics
 Wheelchair racing at the 2004 Summer Olympics

 
2004 Summer Paralympics events
2004
Paralympics
2004 Paralympics
2004 Paralympics